December 17 - Eastern Orthodox liturgical calendar - December 19

All fixed commemorations below celebrated on December 31 by Eastern Orthodox Churches on the Old Calendar.

For December 18th, Orthodox Churches on the Old Calendar commemorate the Saints listed on December 5.

Saints
 Martyr Eubotius, at Cyzicus (320)
 Martyrs Phocas and Hermilas, by the sword.
 Hieromartyrs Zacchaeus, Deacon, and Alphaeus, reader, at Caesarea. (see also November 18)
 Hieromartyr Modestus I, Archbishop of Jerusalem (389) (see also December 16 - Modestus II)
 Saint Florus, Bishop of Amisus (7th century)
 Saint Michael the Confessor, at Constantinople (845)
 Saint Sophia the Wonderworker.
 Venerable Nomon.

Pre-Schism Western saints
 Martyrs Rufus and Zosimus, at Philippi in Macedonia (c. 107)
 Martyr Moses (Moysetes), a martyr in North Africa who probably suffered under Decius (c. 250)
 Martyrs Quintus, Simplicius and Companions, in North Africa under the Emperors Decius and Valerian (c. 255)
 Martyrs Victurus, Victor, Victorinus, Adjutor, Quartus and 30 other companions, in North Africa.
 Martyr Sebastian, at Rome, and his companions: 
 Martyrs Nicostratus, Zoe, Castorius, Tranquillinus, Marcellinus, Mark, Claudius, Symphorian, Victorinus, Tiburtius, and Castulus (287)
 Saint Gatianus of Tours, first Bishop of Tours (3rd century)
 Saint Bodagisil, founded and was the first Abbot of a monastery on the Meuse in Belgium (588)
 Saint Samthann, foundress of the convent of Clonbroney in Co. Longford in Ireland (6th century)
 Saint Flannán, first Bishop of Killaloe in Ireland (7th century)
 Saint Desiderius of Fontenelle (Desideratus), son of St Waningus (700)
 Saint Winebald (Winibald), Abbot of Heidenheim and Bishop of Eichstatt (Germany) (761)

Post-Schism Orthodox saints
 Saint Daniel the Hesychast (Daniil Sihastrul), of Voroneț Monastery, Romania (15th century)
 Venerable Sebastian, Abbot of Poshekhonye Monastery (Vologda) (1500)

New martyrs and confessors
 Martyr Victor Matveev (1936)
 New Hieromartyr Thaddeus (Uspensky), Archbishop of Tver (1937)
 New Hieromartyr Nicholas (Klementiev), Archbishop of Great Ustiug (Velikoustiuzh) (1937)
 New Hieromartyrs (1937):
 Andrew Voskresensky of Moscow, 
 John Mironsky of Chimkent, 
 Vladimir Preobrazhensky of Chimkent, and 
 Elias Benemansky of Tver, Priests (1937)
 New Hieromartyr Sergius Astakhov, Deacon (1942)
 Virgin-martyr Vera Truks of Zhitomir (1942)

Other commemorations
 Consecration of the Church of the Theotokos in Halkoprateia-Constantinople.
 Glorification (1694) of Righteous Simeon, Wonderworker of Verkhoturye (1642)
 Repose of Schemanun Nazaria, Eldress of Varatec Monastery (Romania) (1814)
 Second Finding of the Wonderworking Icon of Panagia Evangelistria of Tinos (1842)  (see also: January 30)
 Repose of Metropolitan Benjamin (Costachi) of Moldavia (1846) 
 Slaying of Hieromonk Nestor of Zharki (Ivanovo) (1993)

Gallery

Notes

References

Sources
 December 18/31. Orthodox Calendar (PRAVOSLAVIE.RU).
 December 31 / December 18. HOLY TRINITY RUSSIAN ORTHODOX CHURCH (A parish of the Patriarchate of Moscow).
 December 18. OCA - The Lives of the Saints.
 The Autonomous Orthodox Metropolia of Western Europe and the Americas (ROCOR). St. Hilarion Calendar of Saints for the year of our Lord 2004. St. Hilarion Press (Austin, TX). p. 94.
 December 18. Latin Saints of the Orthodox Patriarchate of Rome.
 The Roman Martyrology. Transl. by the Archbishop of Baltimore. Last Edition, According to the Copy Printed at Rome in 1914. Revised Edition, with the Imprimatur of His Eminence Cardinal Gibbons. Baltimore: John Murphy Company, 1916.
Greek Sources
 Great Synaxaristes:  18 ΔΕΚΕΜΒΡΙΟΥ. ΜΕΓΑΣ ΣΥΝΑΞΑΡΙΣΤΗΣ.
  Συναξαριστής. 18 Δεκεμβρίου. ECCLESIA.GR. (H ΕΚΚΛΗΣΙΑ ΤΗΣ ΕΛΛΑΔΟΣ). 
Russian Sources
  31 декабря (18 декабря). Православная Энциклопедия под редакцией Патриарха Московского и всея Руси Кирилла (электронная версия). (Orthodox Encyclopedia - Pravenc.ru).
  18 декабря (ст.ст.) 31 декабря 2013 (нов. ст.). Русская Православная Церковь Отдел внешних церковных связей. (DECR).

December in the Eastern Orthodox calendar